The Royal Malaysian Customs Department Museum is a museum about Royal Malaysian Customs Department in Malacca City, Malacca, Malaysia.

The museum building was constructed under the British government rule in the early 1890s to store imported trade goods and goods for export. Its role as warehouses changed in 2001 when all of the export and import activities were moved to the ports in Kuala Linggi and Sungai Rambai. A portion of the building was converted to the office of the Malacca State Customs Department from the 1950s, until 2003 upon the completion of Wisma Kastam, before finally converted into the present-day Museum and was opened on 25 August 2006 by Malacca Chief Minister Mohd Ali Rustam.

See also
 List of museums in Malaysia
 List of tourist attractions in Malacca

References

2006 establishments in Malaysia
Buildings and structures in Malacca City
Museums established in 2006
Museums in Malacca